In Search Of... is the third studio album by Fu Manchu, a stoner rock band from Southern California. It was released in 1996 on Mammoth Records. This was the last album with Ruben Romano and Eddie Glass. Shortly after its release, they left to form the band Nebula.

Track listing

Personnel 
Scott Hill – vocals, guitar, producer
Ruben Romano – drums, producer
Eddie Glass – guitar, producer
Brad Davis – bass, producer

Production
Recorded, mixed and produced by Brian Jenkins
Assistant engineer: Josh Turner
Mastered by Eddy Schreyer at Future Disc Systems, N. Hollywood, CA
Cover and back photos by Alex Obleas
Fu Manchu photographed by Lisa Johnson
All music Fu Manchu, all lyrics Scott Hill
1996 Van-O-Rama Music/ASCAP except "Redline" published by Van-O-Rama and Concorde New Horizon Corp./ASCAP

References 

1996 albums
Fu Manchu (band) albums
Stoner rock albums
Mammoth Records albums